These are the Australian Country number-one albums of 2005, per the ARIA Charts.

See also
2005 in music
List of number-one albums of 2005 (Australia)

References

2005
Aust
Count